Harmanjit "Mickey" Singh (born December 21, 1990) is an Indian-American singer, songwriter, producer, dancer, model and actor. He gained widespread popularity through his first mixtape of Punjabi and English music, Mick's Tape. It was released for free download on July 22, 2013 and included the tracks Bad Girl, In Love and Rani Mehlan Di. His music combines American and Punjabi music, and epitomizes the Urban Desi genre; it has also been influenced by jazz.

His recent singles have included Rooftop Party, Ho Gaya Pyaar, Body, Hold Me, Lost, Phone and Yarri Yeah,
Na Na, 4AM, Nachle 101.

Early life 
Born in Hoshiarpur, Punjab, India, into an Punjabi family, Singh began singing at the age of 3. At the age of 13, Singh attended Heritage High School. He moved to New York City, United States at the same age.

At the age of 15, he began work in a local music studio to learn sound design and mixing. During this time, he continued listening to Bollywood music which inspired him to sing Hindi songs later on into his career.

Career

2012 - 2014
In 2012, he released a Punjabi remix of "Birthday Cake", with vocals by Singh and Amar Sandhu. Shortly after, in December 2012, he released a remake of Rahat Fateh Ali Khan's Akhiyan with his own blend of western music and Punjabi vocals. On July 22, 2013, he released the mixtape Mick's Tape which included ten songs that incorporated a blend of western sounds and Indian vocals. His Mick's Tape Tour spread across 50 cities in North America.

Bad Girl was the first music video from the mixtape. At present, it has received over 22 million views breaking Mickey Singh into the Urban Desi scene. The single was recognized as a must have in your Punjabi workout playlist by Women's Health magazine in December 2014.

The second song from the EP which has a music video is titled "In Love" featured Mickey Singh alongside Pakistani teenage artist Asim Azhar.

2014 - Present
His first official single was through his own label MathOne Ent. The track is titled "Double Addi" and it features vocals from Singh, Amar Sandhu, and DJ Ice. The music for the song is also produced by Singh along with 2 NyCe. It now has over 10 million + views.

His first official release in India and also through an Indian-based record label occurred on February 9, 2015 when he released the single "Ho Gaya Pyar" through Speed Records. He won "Best North American Act" at the Brit Asia TV Music Awards 2015.

Singh collaborated with Diljit Dosanjh on romantic song titled "Ishq Haazir Hai" for whom Singh wrote the lyrics and produced the music. The song reached No. 1 on the BBC Asian Network download chart the first week.

Singh has performed alongside the Bollywood singers Shaan, Sunidhi Chauhan, Ali Zafar, Manj Musik, Raftaar, Badshah, Imran Khan, Jay Sean and also with actors like Parineeti Chopra, Aditya Roy Kapoor and Harjot Dhillon.

In 2018 Singh appeared in the Zee 5 show Lockdown along with Monali Thakur which was produced by Badshah's production house Afterhours.

In January 2019, Singh performed the half-time show for the NBA basketball game, Golden State Warriors vs. Sacramento Kings, at Golden 1 Center arena in Sacramento, CA.

Discography

See also
List of American musicians
List of Indian singers
List of dancers
List of songwriters
List of record producers

Concert tour(s)

Live performances 
Straight Up Punjab (2019)
BBCAsianNetwork (2019)
Vancouver (2018)

References

External links 
 www.mickeysingh.com
 Instagram page
 Twitter
 Facebook page
 Soundcloud
 Apple music
 Official YouTube
 Snapchat

1990 births
Living people
American male songwriters
American male dancers
Male models from California
American male actors
American people of Punjabi descent
American male singers of Indian descent
21st-century American singers
Indian emigrants to the United States
Expatriate musicians in India
American expatriates in India
21st-century American male singers